Aznavour toujours (Forever the Aznavour) is the 50th French studio album by the French-Armenian singer Charles Aznavour, released in 2011. Toujours became his seventh album in the 21st century. According to Allmusic, "this collection of 12 self-penned tracks shows that the 87-year-old is still capable of cutting it alone".  Album cover photograph is taken by Karl Lagerfeld.

History
The songs were written and recorded in France and Belgium. For the arrangements, Eumir Deodato (Frank Sinatra, Aretha Franklin, Björk) and Yvan Cassar (Mylène Farmer, Johnny Hallyday) were invited and the album "travels to Brazil and Paris, with an occasional little trip to Broadway and even Spain for Flamenca, flamenco".

One of the songs, "J'ai Connu" (Gypsy jazz), addresses the genocides that have occurred during Aznavour's lifetime.

It was released digitally on August 30, 2011 by Capitol/EMI. After the release, Aznavour started his new Aznavour en Toute Intimité tour in 2011.

Track listing 
 Viens m'emporter
 La vie est faite de hasards
 L'instinct du chasseur
 Les jours
 Que j'aime ca
 Ce printemps-la
 Des coups de poing
 Flamenca Flamenco
 J'ai connu
 Je pense à toi
 Elle (duet with Thomas Dutronc)
 Tu ne m'aimes plus
 Va

Personnel 
 Charles Aznavour - Adaptation, Author, Composer, Vocals
 Erwin Autrique - Programming
 Erik Berchot - Piano
 Philippe Berrod - Soloist
 Benjamin Caillaud - Pro-Tools
 Nathalie Carlucci - Alto
 Yvan Cassar - Piano
 Hervé Defranoux - Production Executive
 Françoise Demaubus - Soloist
 Eumir Deodato - Arranger, Fender Rhodes
 Pierre-François Dufour - Soloist
 Thomas Dutronc - Featured Artist, Soloist
 Jorge Fernandez - Production Executive
 Nicolas Fiszman - Basse
 Griet François - Alto
 Frédéric Gastard  - Sax (Baritone), Sax (Soprano), Sax (Tenor)
 Herbert Kretzmer - Composer
 Karl Lagerfeld - Photography
 Robert Le Gall - Cuatro, Mandoline
 Alexandra Logerot-Brown - Alto
 Mathias Malher - Trombone
 Jocelyn Mienniel - Flute, Saxophone
 Nicolas Montazaud - Palmas, Percussion
 Jérome Munafo - Guitar
 Jonathan Nazet - Alto
 Frédéric Pallas - Alto
 Paris Symphonic Orchestra
 Laurent Puchard - Alto
 Eric Sauviat - Guitar
 Levon Sayan - Personal Manager
 Mark Steylaerts - Soloist
 Lionel Surin - Cor
 Jacky Terrasson - Piano
 Estelle Villotte - Alto
 Eric Wilms - Arranger, Hammond B3, Piano
 Jean-Michel Yavernier - Cor, Soloist

Charts

References

Links
An official video from EMI
Album info on Aznavour's official site
« Aznavour toujours », France Inter

2011 albums
Charles Aznavour albums